Battus eracon, the west-Mexican swallowtail or Colima swallowtail, is a species of butterfly in the family Papilionidae. It is found in western Mexico where it is local and uncommon. The larvae feed on Aristolochia tentaculata.

Description
The forewing has a row of submarginal spots. The hindwing has a uniformly curved band of spots, placed about midway between the cell and the outer margin. Under surface of the hindwing has red submarginal spots, each with a yellowish white dot at the outer side.

References

Further reading

 
Edwin Möhn, 2002 Schmetterlinge der Erde, Butterflies of the World Part V (5), Papilionidae II: Battus. Edited by Erich Bauer and Thomas Frankenbach Keltern: Goecke & Evers; Canterbury: Hillside Books.   Illustrates and identifies 14 species and 49 subspecies. Page 6, plate 9, figures 7-8, plate 19, figures 3-4.

eracon
Endemic Lepidoptera of Mexico
Butterflies of North America
Taxa named by Frederick DuCane Godman
Taxa named by Osbert Salvin